The Super Bowl is the annual American football game that determines the champion of the National Football League (NFL). The game culminates a season that begins in the previous calendar year, and is the conclusion of the NFL playoffs. The winner receives the Vince Lombardi Trophy. The contest is held in an American city, chosen three to four years beforehand, usually at warm-weather sites or domed stadiums. Since January 1971, the winner of the American Football Conference (AFC) Championship Game has faced the winner of the National Football Conference (NFC) Championship Game in the culmination of the NFL playoffs.

Before the 1970 merger between the American Football League (AFL) and the National Football League (NFL), the two leagues met in four such contests. The first two were marketed as the "AFL–NFL World Championship Game", but were also casually referred to as "the Super Bowl game" during the television broadcast. Super Bowl III in January 1969 was the first such game that carried the "Super Bowl" moniker in official marketing; the names "Super Bowl I" and "Super Bowl II" were retroactively applied to the first two games. 

A total of 20 franchises, including teams that have relocated to another city or changed their name, have won the Super Bowl. There are four NFL teams that have never appeared in a Super Bowl: the Cleveland Browns, Detroit Lions, Jacksonville Jaguars, and Houston Texans, though both the Browns (1950, 1954, 1955, 1964) and Lions (1935, 1952, 1953, 1957) had won NFL Championship Games prior to the creation of the Super Bowl in the 1966 season. 

The 1972 Dolphins capped off the only perfect season in NFL history with their victory in Super Bowl VII. Only two franchises have ever won the Super Bowl while hosting at their home stadiums: the Tampa Bay Buccaneers in Super Bowl LV and the Los Angeles Rams in Super Bowl LVI.

Super Bowl championship games (1966–present)
Numbers in parentheses in the table are Super Bowl appearances as of the date of that Super Bowl and are used as follows:
 Winning team and losing team columns indicate the number of times that team has appeared in a Super Bowl as well as each respective teams' Super Bowl record to date.
 Venue column indicates number of times that stadium has hosted a Super Bowl.
 City column indicates number of times that metropolitan area has hosted a Super Bowl.

 Indicates a team that made the playoffs as a wild card team (rather than by winning a division).

Upcoming games

Consecutive wins

Seven franchises have won consecutive Super Bowls, one of which (Pittsburgh) has accomplished it twice:

 Green Bay Packers (Super Bowls I and II)
 Miami Dolphins (VII and VIII)
 Pittsburgh Steelers (twice: IX and X; XIII and XIV)
 San Francisco 49ers (XXIII and XXIV)
 Dallas Cowboys (XXVII and XXVIII)
 Denver Broncos (XXXII and XXXIII)
 New England Patriots (XXXVIII and XXXIX)

No franchise has ever won three Super Bowls in a row. Several franchises have had eras of sustained success, nearly accomplishing a three-peat:

 The Green Bay Packers won the first two Super Bowls, and also won the NFL Championship Game the preceding year. If the Super Bowl had been instituted that year, the Packers would have qualified and faced the Buffalo Bills of the AFL.
 The Miami Dolphins appeared in three consecutive Super Bowls (VI, VII, and VIII) – winning the last two, and coming within one win of three consecutive Super Bowl titles.
 The Dallas Cowboys won two consecutive Super Bowls (XXVII and XXVIII); the following season they were eliminated in the NFC Championship Game, two wins short of a three-peat, by the eventual Super Bowl XXIX champion San Francisco 49ers. The Cowboys won Super Bowl XXX the following year for three wins in four seasons, and thus were two wins away from four consecutive Super Bowl titles.
 The Kansas City Chiefs made three Super Bowls in four years, winning LIV and LVII, while losing LV. In the intervening year, they lost the 2021 AFC Championship Game to the Cincinnati Bengals in overtime, coming one win short of four consecutive appearances. Additionally, in the year prior to their victory in LIV, the Chiefs likewise lost the 2018 AFC Championship Game to the New England Patriots in overtime, resulting in being two wins short of five consecutive appearances.
 The New England Patriots won Super Bowls XLIX, LI, and LIII for three wins in five seasons. They also appeared in and lost Super Bowl LII to the Philadelphia Eagles following the 2017 season, giving them four Super Bowl appearances in five years and putting them one win away from three consecutive Super Bowl titles. Moreover, in the intervening year, were eliminated in the AFC Championship Game by the eventual Super Bowl 50 champion Denver Broncos. In total, then, the Patriots were three wins away from five consecutive Super Bowl appearances.
 The Pittsburgh Steelers won two consecutive Super Bowls (IX and X); the following season they were eliminated in the AFC Championship Game, two wins short of a three-peat, by the eventual Super Bowl XI champion Oakland Raiders. They also won two more consecutive Super Bowls (XIII and XIV) for four wins in six seasons.
 The San Francisco 49ers won two consecutive Super Bowls (XXIII and XXIV); the following season they were eliminated in the NFC Championship Game, two wins short of a three-peat, by the eventual Super Bowl XXV champion New York Giants.

Consecutive losses
Three franchises have lost consecutive Super Bowls:
 Buffalo Bills (4) (Super Bowls XXV, XXVI, XXVII, and XXVIII) – The only team to appear in four straight Super Bowls; they lost in all four appearances.
 Minnesota Vikings (2) (VIII and IX) – They also lost Super Bowl XI, and were knocked out of the 1975–76 playoffs by the eventual Super Bowl X losers, the Dallas Cowboys, for three losses in four seasons.
 Denver Broncos (2) (XXI and XXII) – They also lost Super Bowl XXIV, but did not qualify for the 1988–89 playoffs for Super Bowl XXIII for three losses in four seasons.

Consecutive appearances
The Buffalo Bills have the most consecutive appearances with four from 1990 to 1993. The Miami Dolphins (1971–1973) and New England Patriots (2016–2018) are the only other teams to have at least three consecutive appearances. All three teams with three or more consecutive Super Bowl appearances are in the AFC East division. Including those three, 11 teams have at least two consecutive appearances. The Dallas Cowboys are the only team with three separate streaks (1970–1971, 1977–1978, and 1992–1993). The Green Bay Packers, Pittsburgh Steelers, Denver Broncos, and New England Patriots have each had two separate consecutive appearances. The Kansas City Chiefs are the most recent team to appear in consecutive Super Bowls playing in Super Bowl LIV and Super Bowl LV. The full listing of teams with consecutive appearances is below in order of first occurrence; winning games are in bold:
 Green Bay Packers (twice: Super Bowls I and II; XXXI and XXXII)
 Dallas Cowboys (thrice: V and VI; XII and XIII; XXVII and XXVIII)
 Miami Dolphins (VI, VII, and VIII)
 Minnesota Vikings (VIII and IX)
 Pittsburgh Steelers (twice: IX and X; XIII and XIV)
 Washington Redskins (XVII and XVIII)
 Denver Broncos (twice: XXI and XXII; XXXII and XXXIII)
 San Francisco 49ers (XXIII and XXIV)
 Buffalo Bills (XXV, XXVI, XXVII, and XXVIII)
 New England Patriots (twice: XXXVIII and XXXIX; LI, LII, and LIII)
 Seattle Seahawks (XLVIII and XLIX)
 Kansas City Chiefs (LIV and LV)

Super Bowl rematches

The following teams have faced each other more than once in the Super Bowl:
 3 times – Pittsburgh Steelers (X and XIII) vs. Dallas Cowboys (XXX) see also Cowboys–Steelers rivalry
 2 times – Miami Dolphins (VII) vs. Washington Commanders (XVII)
 2 times – San Francisco 49ers (XVI and XXIII) vs. Cincinnati Bengals
 2 times – Dallas Cowboys (XXVII and XXVIII) vs. Buffalo Bills
 2 times – New York Giants (XLII and XLVI) vs. New England Patriots see also Giants–Patriots rivalry
 2 times – New England Patriots (XXXIX) vs. Philadelphia Eagles (LII)
 2 times – New England Patriots (XXXVI and LIII) vs. St. Louis/Los Angeles Rams

Super Bowl record by team

In the sortable table below, teams are ordered first by number of wins, followed by the number of appearances, and finally by the total number of points scored by the team throughout all appearances.

Teams with no Super Bowl appearances or long active droughts

Four current teams have never reached the Super Bowl (shown in bold below). Two of them (Jacksonville and Houston) joined the NFL relatively recently, and there are an additional eight teams whose Super Bowl appearance droughts began prior to 2002 (the year Houston joined the NFL).  The other two teams that have never appeared in a Super Bowl (Cleveland and Detroit) both held NFL league championships prior to Super Bowl I in the 1966 NFL season.  Teams are listed below according to the length of their current Super Bowl droughts:
 Cleveland Browns, 57 years – NFL champions four times in 1950, 1954, 1955, and 1964; appeared in seven other NFL Championship Games in 1951, 1952, 1953, 1957, 1965, 1968, and 1969; and appeared in three AFC Championship Games in the 1986, 1987, and 1989 seasons. The Browns are officially viewed as one continuous franchise that began in 1946 as a member of the All-America Football Conference, joined the NFL in 1950, suspended operations after 1995, and resumed play in 1999. 
 Detroit Lions, 57 years – NFL champions four times in 1935, 1952, 1953, and 1957; appeared in one other NFL Championship Game in 1954; and appeared in one NFC Championship Game in the 1991 season.
 New York Jets, 54 years – Won Super Bowl III, 1968 season 
 Minnesota Vikings, 46 years – Lost Super Bowl XI, 1976 season
 Miami Dolphins, 38 years – Lost Super Bowl XIX, 1984 season
 Washington Commanders, 31 years – Won Super Bowl XXVI, 1991 season (played as Washington Redskins)
 Buffalo Bills, 29 years – Lost Super Bowl XXVIII, 1993 season
 Los Angeles Chargers, 28 years – Lost Super Bowl XXIX, 1994 season (played as San Diego Chargers)
 Jacksonville Jaguars, 27 years – 1995 expansion team; AFC Championship Game appearances in the 1996, 1999, and 2017 seasons.
 Dallas Cowboys, 27 years – Won Super Bowl XXX, 1995 season
 Tennessee Titans, 23 years – Lost Super Bowl XXXIV, 1999 season
 Houston Texans, 20 years – 2002 expansion team; Divisional Round appearances in the 2011, 2012, 2016, and 2019 seasons. They are the only NFL team to never reach the Conference Championship Round.

Teams with Super Bowl appearances but no victories
Eight teams have appeared in the Super Bowl without ever winning. In descending order of number of appearances and then years since their last appearance, they are:
 Minnesota Vikings (4) – appeared in Super Bowls IV, VIII, IX, and XI; they won the NFL Championship in 1969, the last year before the AFL–NFL merger, but failed to win the subsequent Super Bowl. An NFL expansion team in 1961, they have no pre-Super Bowl league championships.
 Buffalo Bills (4) – XXV, XXVI, XXVII, and XXVIII; in 1964 and 1965, they won the last two AFL Championships before the first Super Bowl in 1966.
 Cincinnati Bengals (3) – XVI, XXIII, and LVI; an AFL expansion team in 1968, they have no pre-Super Bowl league championships.
 Carolina Panthers (2) – XXXVIII and 50; a post-merger expansion team, their first season was in 1995.
 Atlanta Falcons (2) – XXXIII and LI; an NFL expansion team in 1966, they have no pre-Super Bowl league championships.
 Los Angeles Chargers (1) – XXIX as the San Diego Chargers; their only AFL Championship was in 1963, also as the San Diego Chargers.
 Tennessee Titans (1) – XXXIV; they won the first two AFL Championships in 1960 and 1961 as the Houston Oilers.
 Arizona Cardinals (1) – XLIII; their only uncontested NFL Championship was in 1947 as the Chicago Cardinals. They also claim the 1925 NFL Championship.

See also

 History of the National Football League championship
 List of players with most Super Bowl championships
 List of AFC champions
 List of NFC champions
 List of NFL champions from 1920 to 1969
 List of AAFC champions
 List of Super Bowl records
 Super Bowl Most Valuable Player Award
 List of NFL franchise post-season droughts
 List of NFL franchise post-season streaks

Explanatory notes

References

External links
 National Football League
 Super Bowl
 List of winning rosters

Champions
Super Bowl